Aechmea rubens is a plant species in the genus Aechmea. It was described from specimens cultivated in the Jardin Botanique de Montréal, supposedly grown from Brazilian material. Exactly place of origin unknown, and the species has not been located in the wild.

Cultivars
Several cultivars are recognized

 Aechmea 'Isabel D'Bellard'
 Aechmea 'Laura Lynn'
 Aechmea 'Tropica'

References

rubens
Garden plants